Half a Century of Song is a 1952 Italian anthology comedy film by Domenico Paolella.

Plot

Cast
 Marco Vicario
 Cosetta Greco
 Anna Maria Ferrero
 Franco Interlenghi
 Maria Fiore
 Flora Mariel
 Olga Villi
 Carlo Dapporto
 Silvana Pampanini
 Galeazzo Benti
 Erno Crisa
 Carlo Hinterman
 Pina Gallini
 Achille Millo
 Lauretta Masiero
 Renato Malavasi
 Renato Rascel
 Nico Pepe
 Mario Siletti
 Maria Pia Casilio

External links
 

1952 films
1950s Italian-language films
Films directed by Domenico Paolella
Films scored by Carlo Rustichelli
Italian anthology films
Italian comedy films
1952 comedy films
1950s Italian films